Kanrud or Kan Rud may refer to:
 Kan Rud, Fars
 Kanrud, Gilan